Forensic Medical Examiner may refer to:

 Forensic pathologist, in the United States
 Force Medical Examiner, in the United Kingdom